The Kennedy curse is a series of premature deaths, accidents, assassinations, and other calamities involving members of the American Kennedy family. The alleged curse has primarily struck the children and descendants of businessman Joseph P. Kennedy Sr., but it has also affected family friends, associates, and other relatives. Political assassinations and plane crashes have been the most common manifestations of the "curse". Following the Chappaquiddick incident in 1969, Ted Kennedy is quoted saying he questioned if "some awful curse did actually hang over all the Kennedys."

Chronology
Events that have been treated as evidence of a curse include:

Kennedy deaths 

 August 12, 1944 – Joseph P. Kennedy Jr. died when the BQ-8 aircraft he was piloting accidentally exploded over East Suffolk, England. (A BQ-8 was a B-24 Liberator converted into a radio-controlled flying bomb. For more information, see Project Anvil.)
 September 9, 1944 – William Cavendish, Marquess of Hartington, newlywed husband of Kathleen Kennedy was fatally shot by a German sniper while leading his company near Heppen, Belgium.
 May 13, 1948 – Kathleen "Kick" Kennedy (formally known as Kathleen Cavendish, Marchioness of Hartington) died in a plane crash in France.
 August 9, 1963 – Patrick Bouvier Kennedy died of infant respiratory distress syndrome two days after his premature birth on August 7 in Otis Air Force Base, Massachusetts (the 20th anniversary of his father's rescue after the sinking of PT-109).
 November 22, 1963 – U.S. President John F. Kennedy was assassinated in Dallas, Texas, by Lee Harvey Oswald. Oswald was shot dead by Jack Ruby two days later. In 1964, the Warren Commission concluded that Oswald was the lone assassin. However, in 1979, the United States House Select Committee on Assassinations (HSCA) concluded that the assassination was the result of a conspiracy and that Oswald did not act alone.
 June 5, 1968 – United States Senator Robert F. Kennedy was shot by Sirhan Sirhan in the Ambassador Hotel in Los Angeles on the night of his victory in the California Democratic presidential primary; Robert died the following morning.
 April 25, 1984 – David A. Kennedy died of a drug overdose in a Palm Beach, Florida hotel room. David was twelve years old when he saw his father assassinated on live TV in the family's hotel room. Following a car accident, David began to abuse painkillers and was in and out of detox facilities throughout his youth. On the day of his death, David was in Palm Beach to see his grandmother, who had just had a stroke.
 December 31, 1997 – Michael LeMoyne Kennedy died in a skiing accident after crashing into a tree in Aspen, Colorado.
 July 16, 1999 – John F. Kennedy Jr. died when the plane he was piloting crashed into the Atlantic Ocean off the coast of Martha's Vineyard, Massachusetts. The crash was attributed to pilot error and spatial disorientation. His wife and sister-in-law were also on board and died.
 September 16, 2011 – Kara Kennedy died of a heart attack while exercising in a Washington, D.C. health club. Kara had reportedly suffered from lung cancer nine years earlier, but she had recovered after the removal of part of her right lung.
 May 16, 2012 – Mary Richardson Kennedy died by suicide on the grounds of her home in Bedford, Westchester County, New York.
 August 1, 2019 – Saoirse Roisin Kennedy Hill, granddaughter of Robert F. Kennedy, died of an accidental drug overdose at the Kennedy Compound in Hyannis Port, Massachusetts on Cape Cod.
 April 2, 2020 – Maeve Kennedy McKean disappeared with her eight-year-old son, Gideon, during a short canoe trip in the Chesapeake Bay. Maeve's body was found by divers four days later. Gideon's body was found two days after hers, on April 8. Authorities believe Maeve paddled to retrieve her son's ball, leading the wind and current to overturn the canoe.

Other incidents

 November 1941 – Rosemary Kennedy, age 23, struggled to read and write, and she suffered from mood swings, seizures, and violent outbursts. During birth, Rosemary was deprived of oxygen as her mother and nurse waited for the doctor to arrive. As she grew older, she became more rebellious and the family worried she would do something that could tarnish the Kennedy reputation. In an attempt to cure or treat his daughter, Joseph Kennedy secretly arranged for her to undergo a prefrontal lobotomy, which was seen as a promising treatment for various mental illnesses. Instead of saving Rosemary, the now-discredited procedure left her mentally and physically incapacitated. Rosemary remained institutionalized in seclusion, in rural Wisconsin, until her death in 2005. Her family remained distant for most of Rosemary's life, but Eunice Kennedy Shriver, her sister, grew close with Rosemary later in life. Eunice went on to found the Special Olympics and the Joseph P. Kennedy Jr. Foundation which researches developmental and intellectual disabilities.
 June 19, 1964 – U.S. Senator Ted Kennedy survived a plane crash that killed one of his aides as well as the pilot. The plane was on its way to a Democratic State Endorsing Convention in Springfield. The small plane crashed in an apple orchard near Southampton, Massachusetts. The senator was pulled from the wreckage by passenger (and fellow senator) Birch Bayh. Kennedy spent five months in a hospital recovering from a broken back, a punctured lung, broken ribs, and internal bleeding. Following the crash, Bobby Kennedy remarked to aide Ed Guthman: "Somebody up there doesn't like us."
 July 18, 1969 – Ted Kennedy accidentally drove his car off a bridge on Chappaquiddick Island, Massachusetts, resulting in the drowning death of 28-year-old passenger Mary Jo Kopechne. In his televised statement a week later, Ted said that on the night of the incident he wondered "whether some awful curse did actually hang over all the Kennedys." Ted did not report the accident to the police until the next morning and pled guilty to a charge of leaving the scene of an accident.
 August 13, 1973 – Joseph P. Kennedy II was the driver of a Jeep that crashed and left his passenger, Pam Kelley, paralyzed. Fellow passenger brother David A. Kennedy was injured. Kelley died in 2020.
 November 17, 1973 – Edward M. Kennedy Jr., age 12, had his right leg surgically amputated as a result of bone cancer. He underwent an experimental two-year drug treatment to cure the cancer.
 April 1, 1991 – William Kennedy Smith was arrested and charged with the rape of a young woman at the Kennedy estate in Palm Beach, Florida. The subsequent trial attracted extensive media coverage. Smith was acquitted.
May 4, 2006 – Congressman Patrick J. Kennedy crashed his automobile while intoxicated into a barricade on Capitol Hill in Washington, D.C., at 2:45 a.m. He later revealed an addiction to prescription medications Ambien and Phenergan and pleaded guilty to driving under the influence of prescription drugs, sentenced to one year probation and a fine of $350.

See also
 Curse of Tippecanoe
 Von Erich family, an American professional wrestling family that faced similar tragedies

References
Citations

Book sources
Klein, Edward (2004) The Kennedy Curse: Why Tragedy Has Haunted America's First Family for 150 Years. New York: St. Martin's Griffin. 

Kennedy family
Curses
Assassination of John F. Kennedy
Urban legends